High River was a provincial electoral district in Alberta mandated to return a single member to the Legislative Assembly of Alberta from 1905 to 1930.

High River history
The High River electoral district was founded as one of the original 25 electoral districts contested in the 1905 Alberta general election upon Alberta joining Confederation in September 1905. The electoral district was a continuation of the High River electoral district responsible for returning a single member to the Legislative Assembly of the Northwest Territories from 1894 to 1905.

Richard Alfred Wallace had previously held the seat for High River in the Northwest Territories Legislature since 1898, was defeated in the 1905 election by Albert Robertson. Robertson, a Conservative won a close race against the Liberal; final results took more than a month to come in, and until they did the candidates traded the unofficial lead.

High River electoral district would be abolished prior to the 1930 Alberta general election and the Okotoks-High River electoral district would be formed.

Members of the Legislative Assembly (MLAs)

Election results

1900s

1910s

1920s

See also
List of Alberta provincial electoral districts
High River, a town in Alberta, Canada
High River (N.W.T. electoral district), an electoral district of the Northwest Territories, Canada between 1884 and 1905

References

Further reading

External links
Elections Alberta
The Legislative Assembly of Alberta

Former provincial electoral districts of Alberta